Kinneff is a roadside hamlet in Aberdeenshire, Scotland, just north of Inverbervie. To the north lies another hamlet, Catterline. Kinneff also has a primary school.

History
Kinneff Old Kirk is famous as the site where the Honours of Scotland were hidden by Christian Fletcher after the Siege of Dunnottar Castle in 1651 until the Restoration in 1660.  The church is now open to the public, and a more modern building is used as the local kirk.

Community groups

Kinneff contains several community groups:

Kinneff Church

Kinneff Church  is part of Arbuthnott, Bervie and Kinneff Church.  The church building was located on the southern side of the main street.  Services were held on the second and fourth Sundays of the month until the site of worship closed on Sunday 13 June 2010 due to dwindling numbers.  The building has been sold for development.  Arbuthnott, Bervie and Kinneff Church still operates buildings in Arbuthnott and Inverbervie where worshipers from Kinneff now attend.

Notable residents

Rev Joseph Robert Fraser (d.1933), minister of the United Free Church in Kinneff, was a Fellow of the Royal Society of Edinburgh.

Local radio
Alongside the commercial enterprise of the local newspaper, The Mearns Leader, Kinneff has a local community radio station in Mearns FM.  Broadcasting from nearby Stonehaven in the town hall, Mearns FM aims to keep Kinneff up to date by publicising local and charity events, as well as playing music.  Staffed completely by volunteers, Mearns FM is run as a not-for-profit organisation, broadcasting under a Community Radio Licence, with a remit to provide local focus news events and programming.  The station is jointly funded by local adverts and local and national grants.  Mearns FM has one of the largest listening areas of any Community Radio Station owing to the Mearns' distributed population.  Mearns FM was set up to try to bring these distant communities together.

Transportation 
Kinneff is served by buses, including the X7 Coastrider.

See also
Bervie Water
Allardice Castle
Christian Fletcher

References

External links

 Catterline, Kinneff and Dunnottar Community Council
 Kinneff Churchyard

Villages in Aberdeenshire